In aerodynamics, lift-induced drag, induced drag, vortex drag, or sometimes drag due to lift, is an aerodynamic drag force that occurs whenever a moving object redirects the airflow coming at it. This drag force occurs in airplanes due to wings or a lifting body redirecting air to cause lift and also in cars with airfoil wings that redirect air to cause a downforce.

For a constant amount of lift, induced drag can be reduced by increasing airspeed. A counter-intuitive effect of this is that, up to the speed-for-minimum-drag, aircraft need less power to fly faster. Induced drag is also reduced when the wingspan is higher, or for wings with wingtip devices.

Explanation

The total aerodynamic force acting on a body is usually thought of as having two components, lift and drag. By definition, the component of force parallel to the oncoming flow is called drag; and the component perpendicular to the oncoming flow is called lift. At practical angles of attack the lift greatly exceeds the drag.

Lift is produced by the changing direction of the flow around a wing. The change of direction results in a change of velocity (even if there is no speed change), which is an acceleration. To change the direction of the flow therefore requires that a force be applied to the fluid; the total aerodynamic force is simply the reaction force of the fluid acting on the wing.

An aircraft in slow flight at a high angle of attack will generate an aerodynamic reaction force with a high drag component. By increasing the speed and reducing the angle of attack, the lift generated can be held constant while the drag component is reduced. At the optimum angle of attack, total drag is minimised. If speed is increased beyond this, total drag will increase again due to increased profile drag.

Vortices
Induced drag causes wingtip vortices. When producing lift, air below the wing is at a higher pressure than the air pressure above the wing. On a wing of finite span, this pressure difference causes air to flow from the lower surface, around the wingtip, towards the upper surface. This spanwise flow of air combines with chordwise flowing air, which twists the airflow and produces vortices along the wing trailing edge. Induced drag is the cause of the vortices; the vortices do not cause induced drag.

The vortices reduce the wing's ability to generate lift, so that it requires a higher angle of attack for the same lift, which tilts the total aerodynamic force rearwards and increases the drag component of that force. The angular deflection is small and has little effect on the lift. However, there is an increase in the drag equal to the product of the lift force and the angle through which it is deflected. Since the deflection is itself a function of the lift, the additional drag is proportional to the square of the lift.

The vortices created are unstable, and they quickly combine to produce wingtip vortices which trail behind the wingtip.

Calculation of induced drag
For a planar wing with an elliptical lift distribution, induced drag Di can be calculated as follows:

,
where
 is the lift,
 is the standard density of air at sea level,
 is the equivalent airspeed, 
 is the ratio of circumference to diameter of a circle, and
 is the wingspan.
From this equation it is clear that the induced drag varies with the square of the lift; and inversely with the square of the equivalent airspeed; and inversely with the square of the wingspan. Deviation from the non-planar wing with elliptical lift distribution are taken into account by dividing the induced drag by the span efficiency factor .

To compare with other sources of drag, it can be convenient to express this equation in terms of lift and drag coefficients:

,   where

and
 is the aspect ratio,
 is a reference wing area.
This indicates how, for a given wing area, high aspect ratio wings are beneficial to flight efficiency. With  being a function of angle of attack, induced drag increases as the angle of attack increases.

The above equation can be derived using Prandtl's lifting-line theory. Similar methods can also be used to compute the minimum induced drag for non-planar wings or for arbitrary lift distributions.

Reducing induced drag
According to the equations above, for wings generating the same lift, the induced drag is inversely proportional to the square of the wingspan. A wing of infinite span and uniform airfoil segment (or a 2D wing) would experience no induced drag. The drag characteristics of a wing with infinite span can be simulated using an airfoil segment the width of a wind tunnel.

An increase in wingspan or a solution with a similar effect is only way to reduce induced drag. The Wright brothers used curved trailing edges on their rectangular wings. Some early aircraft had fins mounted on the tips. More recent aircraft have wingtip-mounted winglets to reduce the induced drag. Winglets also provide some benefit by increasing the vertical height of the wing system. Wingtip mounted fuel tanks and wing washout may also provide some benefit.

Typically, the elliptical spanwise distribution of lift produces the minimum induced drag for a planar wing of a given span. A small number of aircraft have a planform approaching the elliptical — the most famous examples being the World War II Spitfire and Thunderbolt. For modern wings with winglets, the ideal lift distribution is not elliptical.

For a given wing area, a high aspect ratio wing will produce less induced drag than a wing of low aspect ratio. While induced drag is inversely proportional to the square of the wingspan, not necessarily inversely proportional to aspect ratio, if the wing area is held constant, then induced drag will be inversely proportional to aspect ratio. However, since wingspan can be increased while decreasing aspect ratio, or vice versa, the apparent relationship between aspect ratio and induced drag does not always hold.

For a typical twin-engine wide-body aircraft at cruise speed, induced drag is the second-largest component of total drag, accounting for approximately 37% of total drag. Skin friction drag is the largest component of total drag, at almost 48%. Reducing induced drag can therefore significantly reduce cost and environmental impact.

Combined effect with other drag sources

In 1891, Samuel Langley published the results of his experiments on various flat plates. At the same airspeed and the same angle of attack, plates with higher aspect ratio produced greater lift and experienced lower drag than those with lower aspect ratio.

His experiments were carried out at relatively low airspeeds, slower than the speed for minimum drag. He observed that, at these low airspeeds, increasing speed required reducing power. (At higher airspeeds, parasitic drag came to dominate, causing the power required to increase with increasing airspeed.)

Induced drag must be added to the parasitic drag to find the total drag. Since induced drag is inversely proportional to the square of the airspeed (at a given lift) whereas parasitic drag is proportional to the square of the airspeed, the combined overall drag curve shows a minimum at some airspeed - the minimum drag speed (VMD). An aircraft flying at this speed is operating at its optimal aerodynamic efficiency. According to the above equations, the speed for minimum drag occurs at the speed where the induced drag is equal to the parasitic drag. This is the speed at which for unpowered aircraft, optimum glide angle is achieved. This is also the speed for greatest range (although VMD will decrease as the plane consumes fuel and becomes lighter). The speed for greatest range (i.e. distance travelled) is the speed at which a straight line from the origin is tangent to the fuel flow rate curve.

The curve of range versus airspeed is normally very shallow and it is customary to operate at the speed for 99% best range since this gives 3-5% greater speed for only 1% less range. Flying higher where the air is thinner will raise the speed at which minimum drag occurs, and so permits a faster voyage for the same amount of fuel. If the plane is flying at the maximum permissible speed, then there is an altitude at which the air density will be sufficient to keep it aloft while flying at the angle of attack that minimizes the drag. The optimum altitude will increase during the flight as the plane becomes lighter.

The speed for maximum endurance (i.e. time in the air) is the speed for minimum fuel flow rate, and is always less than the speed for greatest range. The fuel flow rate is calculated as the product of the power required and the engine specific fuel consumption (fuel flow rate per unit of power). The power required is equal to the drag times the speed.

See also
Aerodynamic force
Drag
Oswald efficiency number
Parasitic drag
Wave drag
Wingtip vortices

Notes

References

Bibliography
 L. J. Clancy (1975), Aerodynamics, Pitman Publishing Limited, London.  
 Abbott, Ira H., and Von Doenhoff, Albert E. (1959), Theory of Wing Sections, Dover Publications, Standard Book Number 486-60586-8
 Luciano Demasi, Antonio Dipace, Giovanni Monegato, and Rauno Cavallaro.  Invariant Formulation for the Minimum Induced Drag Conditions of Nonplanar Wing Systems, AIAA Journal, Vol. 52, No. 10 (2014), pp. 2223–2240. doi: 10.2514/1.J052837

External links

Drag (physics)
Gliding technology